Hunnselva is a river in Innlandet and Viken counties in Norway. The river generally flows north and it runs through the large lake Einavatnet as it passes through the municipalities of Hurdal, Vestre Toten, and Gjøvik. The mouth of the river is in the town of Gjøvik where it empties into the large lake Mjøsa. Along the course, the river passes through the villages of Eina, Reinsvoll, Raufoss, and Hunndalen. At the town of Gjøvik, the river divides the town with the Nordbyen neighborhood on the north side and the Sørbyen neighborhood to the south. Hunnselva gets its water from bogs and small forest ponds in the west and calcareous streams on the east, meaning the water is rich with nutrients. Its watershed extends from Lynga in the south to Gjøvik and Vardal in the north.

Hunnselva is affected by runoff from the urban infrastructure and sewage in Gjøvik and at one time the river was considered "one of Northern Europe's most polluted rivers." This greatly affected the level of pollution in Lake Mjøsa and by the end of the 19th century, the wildlife had been decimated. Thanks to conservation efforts, however, it has since been restored. The river is now home to trout, perch, pike, whitefish, rudd, and minnows. There is a fly fishing zone along the river where one can do catch and release fishing during the legal fishing season.

Name
Historically, the river was known as the Hunn which means "hunter", likely because the river was a good fishing river. The village of Hunn in nearby Vardal and the village of Hunndalen in Gjøvik Municipality are both named after this river.

See also
List of rivers in Norway

References

Vestre Toten
Gjøvik
Rivers of Innlandet